Lysmata vittata, the peppermint shrimp, is a species of shrimp, native to the Indo-Pacific from East Africa to the Philippines, Japan, Australia and New Zealand.

Lysmata vittata has been suggested as a cleaner shrimp species in aquaculture. This species has been show to successfully remove different parasite species from the orange-spotted grouper (Epinephelus coioides) fish hosts as well as free living stages of Cryptocaryon irritans. Out of four species of clear shrimp that were compared it was the most effective in reducing parasite numbers.

References

Alpheoidea
Crustaceans described in 1860